The 1990 World's Strongest Man was the 13th edition of the World's Strongest Man competition and was won by Jón Páll Sigmarsson from Iceland. It was his fourth title after finishing third the previous year, and his last as he did not compete in any future event before his 1993 death. O.D. Wilson from the United States finished second, and Ilkka Nummisto from Finland finished third after finishing sixth the previous year. The contest was held in Joensuu, Finland.

Final results

References

External links
 Official site
 Many interviews with Worlds Strongest Man competitors and past winners - www.vikingstrength.com

1990 in sports
World's Strongest Man
1990 in Finland